This is the List of municipalities in Bitlis Province, Turkey .

References 

Geography of Bitlis Province
Bitlis